Katherine is the first novel by Anchee Min.  It was published by Riverhead Books in 1995.

Plot summary
Six years after the death of Mao, the People's Republic of China opens its doors to learn how to integrate into the larger world.  The title character, a thirty-six-year-old English teacher in Shanghai, learns a great deal of Chinese culture from interacting with her students in and out of class.

The narrator of the novel, twenty-nine-year-old Zebra Wong, is one of the students who eventually helps her adopt a Chinese girl, Little Rabbit.  However, the principal of the school Katherine teaches at, Mr. Han, becomes suspicious of Katherine's after-class activities and, with the help of Katherine's student and spurned lover Lion Head, seizes upon her "corrupting Western influence" to call for her dismissal.  Katherine appeals to the U.S. consul in Shanghai, but she is returned to America.  She maintains contact with Zebra and tries to make arrangements for her and Little Rabbit to come to the United States as well.

1995 American novels
Novels by Anchee Min
Novels set in Shanghai
Riverhead Books books